Ellzey is a surname. Notable people with the surname include:

Jake Ellzey (born 1970), American politician
Janet Ellzey, American combustion engineer
Lawrence R. Ellzey (1891–1977), American politician

See also
Elzey